The 2016–17 Liechtenstein Cup is the 72nd season of Liechtenstein's annual cup competition. Seven clubs competed with a total of 17 teams for one spot in the first qualifying round of the 2017–18 UEFA Europa League. FC Vaduz are the defending champions.

Participating clubs

TH Title holders.

First round
The first round involved the teams which did not reach the previous season's semifinals. FC Vaduz II (U23) did not enter the competition. Four of them received a bye to the Second round.

|colspan="3" style="background-color:#99CCCC; text-align:center;"|17 August 2016

|-
|colspan="3" style="background-color:#99CCCC; text-align:center;"|23 August 2016

|-
|colspan="3" style="background-color:#99CCCC; text-align:center;"|24 August 2016

|-
|colspan="3" style="background-color:#99CCCC; text-align:center;"|7 September 2016

|}

Second round
The second round involved the four winners of the first round and the four teams which received a bye through to the second round (FC Balzers III, FC Ruggell, FC Triesen, and FC Triesenberg).

|colspan="3" style="background-color:#99CCCC; text-align:center;"|27 September 2016

|-
|colspan="3" style="background-color:#99CCCC; text-align:center;"|28 September 2016

|-
|colspan="3" style="background-color:#99CCCC; text-align:center;"|4 October 2016

|}

Quarterfinals
The quarterfinals involved the four teams who won in the second round, as well as the semifinalists in the last season (FC Vaduz, USV Eschen/Mauren, FC Balzers II and FC Schaan).

|colspan="3" style="background-color:#99CCCC; text-align:center;"|25 October 2016

|-
|colspan="3" style="background-color:#99CCCC; text-align:center;"|26 October 2016

|}

Semifinals

|colspan="3" style="background-color:#99CCCC; text-align:center;"|5 April 2017

|-
|colspan="3" style="background-color:#99CCCC; text-align:center;"|11 April 2017

|}

Final

References

External links
 
RSSSF

Liechtenstein Football Cup seasons
Cup
Liechtenstein Cup